Higher Education Act may refer to:

The Higher Education Act of 1965, an Act of the Congress of the United States that was intended to strengthen the resources of colleges and universities, and to provide financial aid to students
The Higher Education Act 2004, an Act of the Parliament of the United Kingdom which introduced several changes to the higher education system